Lewis Joseph Gibbens  (born 12 November 2000) is an English professional footballer for Boston United.

Career
Gibbens was a member of the Mansfield under-18 side that won the EFL Youth Alliance North East Division title in the 2017/18 campaign and in May 2018 was rewarded with the youth player of the season award.

Gibbens made his football league debut for Mansfield on 25 August 2018 against Macclesfield Town. On 13 September 2019, Gibbens was loaned out to Boston United for the second time.

Gibbens joined Boston United on a one-year contract in August 2020.
On loan to Worksop Town 2020/2021 season

References

2000 births
Living people
Mansfield Town F.C. players
Association football defenders
English Football League players
Boston United F.C. players
English footballers